Ernest Hilliard (January 31, 1890 – September 3, 1947) was an American actor. He appeared in more than 90 films between 1921 and 1947. He was born in New York City and died in Santa Monica, California, from a heart attack.

Selected filmography

 Tropical Love (1921)
 The Matrimonial Web (1921)
 Silver Wings (1922)
 Evidence (1922)
 Who Are My Parents? (1922)
 Married People (1922)
 Love's Old Sweet Song (1923)
 Man and Wife (1923)
 Modern Marriage (1923)
 The Recoil (1924)
 Trouping with Ellen (1924)
 Galloping Hoofs (1924)
 Broadway Lady (1925)
 White Mice (1926)
 The Frontier Trail (1926)
 Forest Havoc (1926)
 The High Flyer (1926)
 Winning the Futurity (1926)
 Broadway After Midnight (1927)
 Let It Rain (1927)
 The Midnight Watch (1927)
 The Scorcher (1927)
 The Racing Fool (1927)
 The Wheel of Destiny  (1927)
 The Silent Hero  (1927) 
 A Bowery Cinderella (1927)
 Modern Daughters (1927)
 The Noose (1928)
 The Matinee Idol (1928)
 The Divine Sinner (1928)
 The Big Hop (1928)
 Dugan of the Dugouts (1928)
 Sinners in Love (1928)
 The Midnight Adventure (1928)
 Out with the Tide (1928)
 Burning Up Broadway (1928)
 Devil Dogs (1928)
 The Awful Truth (1929)
 Wall Street (1929)
 When Dreams Come True (1929)
 Dynamite (1929)
 Red Hot Rhythm (1929)
 Second Honeymoon (1930)
 Mother and Son (1931)
 Flirting with Danger (1934)
 The Boss Rider of Gun Creek (1936)
 Sea Spoilers (1936)

References

External links

1890 births
1947 deaths
American male film actors
American male silent film actors
20th-century American male actors